Naresh Chandra Jamatia (born 16 November 1959) is an Indian politician from Tripura.  He previously served in the Fourth Manik Sarkar ministry as Minister of Forest, Rural Development and Election. He is a former Member of the Legislative Assembly (MLA) of Bagma (Vidhan Sabha constituency) in the Gomati district, Tripura. He is the member of the Communist Party of India (Marxist) and vice-president of Ganamukti Parishad.

Early life & political career 

Jamatia was born on 16 November 1959 to Gobinda Roy Jamatia and Bipra Rani Jamatia. In the 2018 Tripura Legislative Assembly election he was defeated by BJP candidate Ram Pada Jamatia.

References 

1959 births
Living people
Tripura politicians
Communist Party of India (Marxist) politicians from Tripura
Tripuri people